Chris David may refer to:

 Chris David (sound engineer) (born 1953), English sound engineer
 Chris David (footballer) (born 1993), Dutch footballer
 Chris David, American Navy veteran beaten by police in July 2020 during the George Floyd protests in Portland, Oregon